La Tierra de La Bañeza is a Leonese comarca or historical region whose capital is the city of La Bañeza.

Minor comarcas 
La Tierra de La Bañeza has four minor comarcas:

La Vega del Órbigo-Tuerto, including La Bañeza, three municipalities located on the banks of the Tuerto River, Riego de la Vega, Santa María de la Isla and Soto de la Vega in the north, and two municipalities located on the banks of the Órbigo River, Cebrones del Río and Regueras de Arriba, in the south
La Valduerna, the valley of Duerna River, with the following municipalities: Castrillo de la Valduerna, Destriana, Palacios de la Valduerna and Villamontán de la Valduerna.
The comarca of Valdejamuz with the following municipalities: Alija del Infantado, Quintana del Marco, Quintana y Congosto and Santa Elena de Jamuz;
La Valdería, the valley of Eria River, with the following municipalities: Castrocalbón, Castrocontrigo and San Esteban de Nogales.

See also 
 León Province
 La Bañeza
 Kingdom of León
 Leonese language

Bibliography

References

External links
La Tierra de La Bañeza